The Portuguese First Division Women's Volleyball National Championship is the highest professional women's volleyball league in Portugal. It is organized and administrated by the Portuguese Volleyball Federation (FPV).

History
The competition is contested since its inaugural season in 1959–60. It was renamed  for the 1983–84, 1986–87 and 1987–88 seasons. The league was restructured in the 1998–99 season, with the creation of Series A1 and A2 and the introduction of a play-off system at the final stages of the competition. In the 2011–12 season, the Series A! and A2 were restored to a single first division. Since the 2014–15 season, the competition champion is called the  while the four losing first round play-off teams compete for a secondary title.

Results

National Championship

National Championship – Serie A1

National Championship – First Division

Titles by club

References
 Portuguese Volleyball Federation

External links
  Portuguese League. women.volleybox.net 

League, Portuguese Women's Vol
Portugal women
Portugal
Sports leagues established in 1959
1959 establishments in Portugal
Women's sports leagues in Portugal
Professional sports leagues in Portugal